William Orcutt may refer to:
 William Warren Orcutt, petroleum geologist
 William Dana Orcutt, American book designer, typeface designer, historian, and author